This is the complete list of women's medalists at the African Championships in Athletics from 1979 to 2018.

Current program

100 metres

200 metres

400 metres

800 metres

1500 metres

3000 metres

5000 metres

10,000 metres

3000 metres steeplechase

100 metres hurdles

400 metres hurdles

High jump

Pole vault

Long jump

Triple jump

Shot put

Discus throw

Hammer throw

Javelin throw

Pentathlon

Heptathlon

5000 metres track walk

10 kilometres road walk

20 kilometres road walk

4 × 100 metres relay

4 × 400 metres relay

Men's decathlon

Women's heptathlon

References
 African Championships medal winners up to 2004

African Championships
African Championships in Athletics